Boneshaker can refer to:

 Boneshaker (Alton Towers), an amusement park ride in Staffordshire, England
 Boneshaker (bicycle)
 Boneshaker (novel), by Cherie Priest
 Bone Shaker, a 2006 Hot Wheels car
 Boneshaker (Catherine Britt album), by Australian singer Catherine Britt
 Boneshaker (Airbourne album), by Australian rock music ensemble Airbourne